The 2005 Dunlop British Open Championships was held at the National Squash Centre from 9–17 October 2005. Anthony Ricketts won the title defeating James Willstrop in the final.

Seeds

Draw and results

Main draw

References

Men's British Open Squash Championships
Squash in England
Men's British Open
Men's British Open Squash Championship
Men's British Open Squash Championship
2000s in Manchester
Sports competitions in Manchester